This article covers events from the year 1930 in Michigan.

Office holders

State office holders
 Governor of Michigan: Fred W. Green (Republican)
 Lieutenant Governor of Michigan: Luren Dickinson (Republican) 
 Michigan Attorney General: Wilber M. Brucker (Republican)
 Michigan Secretary of State: John S. Haggerty (Republican)
 Speaker of the Michigan House of Representatives: Fred R. Ming (Republican)
 Chief Justice, Michigan Supreme Court:

Mayors of major cities
 Mayor of Detroit: Charles Bowles (Republican)
 Mayor of Grand Rapids: John D. Karel
 Mayor of Flint: Harvey J. Mallery
 Mayor of Lansing: Laird J. Troyer
 Mayor of Saginaw:

Federal office holders

 U.S. Senator from Michigan: James J. Couzens (Republican)
 U.S. Senator from Michigan: Arthur Vandenberg (Republican) 
 House District 1: Robert H. Clancy (Republican)
 House District 2: Earl C. Michener (Republican)
 House District 3: Joseph L. Hooper (Republican)
 House District 4: John C. Ketcham (Republican)
 House District 5: Carl E. Mapes (Republican)
 House District 6: Grant M. Hudson (Republican)
 House District 7: Louis C. Cramton (Republican)
 House District 8: Bird J. Vincent (Republican)
 House District 9: James C. McLaughlin (Republican)
 House District 10: Roy O. Woodruff (Republican)
 House District 11: Frank P. Bohn (Republican)
 House District 12: W. Frank James (Republican)
 House District 13: Clarence J. McLeod (Republican)

Population

Sports

Baseball
 1930 Detroit Tigers season – Under manager Bucky Harris, the Tigers compiled a 75–79 record and finished in fifth place in the American League. The team's statistical leaders included Charlie Gehringer with a .330 batting average, 47 doubles, and 15 triples, Dale Alexander with 20 home runs and 135 RBIs, Earl Whitehill with 17 wins, and Whit Wyatt with a 3.57 earned run average.
 1930 Michigan Wolverines baseball season - Under head coach Ray Fisher, the Wolverines compiled a 9–15–1 record.

American football

 1930 Michigan Wolverines football team – The Wolverines compiled an 8–0–1 record and tied for the Big Ten Conference championship.
 1930 Michigan State Normal Hurons football team – Under head coach Elton Rynearson, the Hurons compiled a record of 6–1, won the Michigan Collegiate Conference championship, and outscored opponents by a total of 145 to 14.
 1930 Michigan State Spartans football team – Under head coach Jim Crowley, the Spartans compiled a 5–1–2 record.
 1930 Western State Hilltoppers football team – Under head coach Mike Gary, the Hilltoppers compiled a 5–1–1 record and outscored opponents, 192 to 25.
 1930 Central State Bearcats football team – Under head coach Butch Nowack, the Bearcats compiled a 6–2 record and outscored opponents by a total of 108 to 81.
 1930 Detroit Titans football team – The Titans compiled a 5–3–2 record under head coach Gus Dorais.

Basketball
 1929–30 Western Michigan Broncos men's basketball team – Under head coach Buck Read, the Broncos compiled a perfect 17–0 record.
 1929–30 Michigan State Spartans men's basketball team – Under head coach Benjamin Van Alstyne, the Spartans compiled a 12–4 record.
 1929–30 Michigan Wolverines men's basketball team – Under head coach George Veenker, the Wolverines compiled a 9–5 record. 
 1920–30 Detroit Titans men's basketball team – Under head coach Louis Conroy, the Titans compiled a 10–9 record.

Ice hockey

 1929–30 Detroit Cougars season – Under general manager and coach Jack Adams, the Red Wings compiled a 14–24–6 record. The team's statistical leaders included Herbie Lewis with 20 goals and Carson Cooper with 18 assists and 36 points. Bill Beveridge was the team's goaltender.
 1929–30 Michigan Wolverines men's ice hockey team –  Under head coach Ed Lowrey, the Wolverines compiled a 12–7–2 record.
 1929–30 Michigan College of Mines and Technology men's ice hockey team – Under head coach Bert Noblet, the Michigan College of Mines and Technology (later renamed Michigan Technological University) team compiled a 2–7 record.
 1929–30 Michigan State Spartans men's ice hockey team – Under head coach John Kobs, the Spartans compiled a 1–4 record.

Other
 Harmsworth Cup – On September 1, Gar Wood won the Harmsworth Cup driving the Miss America IX on the Detroit River with a record average speed of 77.390 miles per hour.
 Port Huron to Mackinac Boat Race –

Chronology of events

January

February

March

April

May

June

July

August

September

October

November
 November 4 - A number of elections occurred, including:
 United States Senate - Republican James J. Couzens was re-elected.
 United States House of Representatives - All 13 of Michigan's U.S. Representatives won re-election except for Grant M. Hudson in Michigan's 6th congressional district, who was not renominated and was replaced by fellow Republican, Seymour H. Person, and Louis C. Cramton in Michigan's 7th congressional district, who was also not renominated and was replaced by fellow Republican, Jesse P. Wolcott. The delegation remained entirely Republican.
 Michigan Governor - Republican nominee, Wilber M. Brucker, defeated Democratic nominee William Comstock.

December

Births

 January 2 - Andy McDonald, football player and coach (Northern Arizona 1965-68), in Flint
 January 9 - Charles Kettles, United States Army lieutenant colonel and Medal of Honor recipient for heroism in Vietnam War, in Ypsilanti
 January 24 - Donald E. Stewart, Academy Award winning screenwriter (Missing, The Hunt for Red October, Patriot Games), in Detroit
 January 26 - Thomas Gumbleton, auxiliary bishop of Detroit known for his anti-war protests during Vietnam War and his advocacy on behalf of homosexuals, in Detroit
 February 8 - Bob Carey, football player at Michigan State and in the NFL, in Charlevoix, Michigan
 February 10 - Robert Wagner, actor (It Takes a Thief, Hart to Hart), in Detroit
 February 26 - Tom Saidock, football player at Michigan State and in the NFL, in Detroit
 February 28 - Robert John Rose, Roman Catholic Bishop of Gaylord (1981–89) and Grand Rapids (1989–2003), in Grand Rapids
 March 9 - Thomas Schippers, conductor known for his work with the New York Philharmonic, Chicago Symphony Orchestra, Cincinnati Symphony Orchestra, and Metropolitan Opera, in Kalamazoo
 March 13 - Harrison Young, film and television actor (elderly Pvt. Ryan in Saving Private Ryan), in Port Huron
 March 15 - Wilma Vaught, first woman to deploy with an Air Force bomber unit and the first woman to reach the rank of brigadier general, in Pontiac
 March 26 - Franklin H. Westervelt, pioneer in the use computers in engineering education, in Benton Harbor, Michigan
 March 28 - Robert Ashley, composer best known for his operas and other theatrical works, many of which incorporated electronics and extended techniques, in Ann Arbor
 April 1 - Grace Lee Whitney, actress (yeoman Janice Rand on Star Trek), in Ann Arbor
 May 31 - Gary Brandner, horror fiction writer (The Howling trilogy of novels), in Sault Ste. Marie, Michigan
 July 1 - Margaret A. Brewer, first female in the United States Marine Corps to reach the rank of general officer, in Durand, Michigan
 July 8 - Earl Van Dyke, main keyboardist for Motown's in-house Funk Brothers band during the late 1960s and early 1970s, in Detroit
 July 15 - Stephen Smale, mathematician specializing in dynamical systems and mathematical economics who was awarded the Fields Medal in 1966, in Flint
 October 4 - James Callahan, film and television actor from 1959 to 2006 (Charles in Charge and M*A*S*H: Sometimes You Hear the Bullet), in Grand Rapids
 October 10 - Ray Truant, played on two Grey Cup championship teams in the Canadian Football League, in Detroit
 October 19 - Joe Koppe, Major League Baseball shortstop from 1958 to 1965, in Detroit
 November 25 - Clarke Scholes, winner of gold medal in 100-meter freestyle swimming at 1952 Summer Olympics, in Detroit

Deaths

 January 25 - Harry Burns Hutchins, President of the University of Michigan (1909–1920), at age 83 in Ann Arbor
 February 14 - Salvatore Catalanotte, an Italian-American mobster and boss of Detroit's Unione Siciliana from 1920 to 1930, in Detroit
 March 21 - Claude H. Van Tyne, University of Michigan history professor who won Pulitzer Prize for The War of Independence, at age 60 in Ann Arbor
 April 5 - Samuel Halpert, painter and head the painting department at the School of the Detroit Society of Arts and Crafts, in Detroit
 April 14 - Frank Kitson, Major League Baseball pitcher (1898-1907), at age 61 at his farm outside of Allegan, Michigan
 April 23 - Larry Twitchell, Major League Baseball pitcher, compiled an 11-1 record for the National League champion Detroit Wolverines in 1887 while batting .333, at age 68 in Cleveland
 May 26 - David D. Aitken, U.S. Congressman (1893-1897) and Mayor of Flint (1904-1905), at age 76 in Flint
 May 31 - Gaspar Milazzo, aka Gaspari Lombardo, a major organized-crime figure in Detroit during the Prohibition era, in a barrage of shotgun blasts at the Vernor Highway Fish Market in Detroit
 October 15 - Herbert Henry Dow, inventor of chemical processes, compounds, and products, and founder of Dow Chemical, at the Mayo Clinic in Rochester, Minnesota
 October 24 - Joseph Boyer, businessman who moved the Burroughs Adding Machine Company from St. Louis to Detroit, in Detroit
 December 8 - Julius Rolshoven, painter and Detroit native, at age 72 at St. Luke's Hospital in New York City
 December 20 - Gerrit J. Diekema, U.S. Congressman (1885-1891), at age 71 at The Hague, Netherlands
 Full date unknown - Charles H. Manly, American Civil War veteran, member of the Michigan House of Representatives (1887–1888), Mayor of Ann Arbor (1890–1891), hit by train around age 86-87 in Jackson

See also
 History of Michigan
 History of Detroit

References